Frederick Sumner may refer to:
 Frederick W. Sumner, merchant and political figure in New Brunswick, Canada
 Frederick Reginald Pinfold Sumner, English cleric and amateur photographer